"A Letter to the Beatles" is a novelty song by the Four Preps. 
It was released as a single on March 9, 1964, by Capitol Records who had both the Beatles and the Four Preps signed to their roster.  

"A Letter to the Beatles" rose to number 85 on the Billboard Hot 100; however, the single was soon deleted by Capitol after Duchess Music, the publisher of "I Want to Hold Your Hand", refused to give permission for a parody version. The recording was later included on a compilation CD by the Four Preps.

Background
The song parodies the Beatlemania of the era, telling the story of a woman who expresses her undying love for the Beatles in a series of letters, to which the Beatles respond by insisting she send "25 cents for an autographed picture" and "one dollar bill for a fan club card". In the end, the woman sends in the money.  The track was co-written by two of the Four Preps, Glen Larson and Bruce Belland and includes parts of the Beatles' song "I Want to Hold Your Hand".

Chart performance

References

Songs about the Beatles
Songs about letters (message)
1964 songs
Novelty songs
Capitol Records singles
The Four Preps songs
Songs written by Bruce Belland
Songs written by Glen A. Larson